World Psychedelic Classics, Vol. 3: Love's a Real Thing is a compilation of West African music from the seventies. The album was released on compact disc by Luaka Bop Records while the vinyl record was released later by Stones Throw with a slightly different track listing.

The album appeared at number 49 on the Pazz & Jop list of 2005.

Track listing

CD

Vinyl

References

2005 compilation albums
World music compilation albums
Psychedelic rock compilation albums
Luaka Bop compilation albums
Soukous albums
Stones Throw Records compilation albums
V2 Records compilation albums